Five Miles to Midnight (French: Le Couteau dans la plaie, literally The Knife in the wound) is a 1962 Franco-Italian international co-production drama film produced and directed by Anatole Litvak. It starred Sophia Loren and Anthony Perkins. It was produced through Filmsonor S.A., Dear Film Produzione and Mercury, and distributed by United Artists.

Plot

Immediately after Lisa (Loren) declares that she is leaving her immature, abusive, but easy-going husband Robert (Perkins), he is reported dead in a plane crash. Secretly still alive, he convinces her to collect his life insurance, although she knows that it's a bad idea. Lisa must contend with the complications of the scheme, which involve an aggressive suitor (Gig Young), Robert's jealousy, and her own guilt.

Eventually the stress of putting up with Robert is too much for Lisa, and she runs over him and disposes of the body and car in a lake. The suitor realizes what she did as she has a mental breakdown and calls the police.

The film takes place primarily in Paris. Lisa is Italian; Robert is American.

Production

The film was directed by Anatole Litvak and produced by Litvak and Louis Wipf from a screenplay by Peter Viertel and Hugh Wheeler with dialogue by Maurice Druon, based on an idea by André Versini. The musical score was written by Mikis Theodorakis for the film, which also includes music by Jacques Loussier and Giuseppe Mengozzi. The cinematography was by Henri Alekan.

The film stars Sophia Loren and Anthony Perkins, with Gig Young, Jean-Pierre Aumont, Yolande Turner, and Tommy Norden.

Cast
 Sophia Loren as Lisa Macklin
 Anthony Perkins as Robert Macklin
 Gig Young as David Barnes
 Jean-Pierre Aumont as Alan Stewart
 Yolande Turner as Barbara Ford
 Tommy Norden as Johnny
 Pascale Roberts as The Streetwalker
 Mathilde Casadesus as Mme. Duval the Concierge
 Billy Kearns as Captain Wade

External links

 
 
 

1962 films
1962 drama films
American black-and-white films
French black-and-white films
Italian black-and-white films
Films directed by Anatole Litvak
Films set in Paris
United Artists films
Films scored by Mikis Theodorakis
English-language French films
English-language Italian films
1960s English-language films